Primehook Creek is a  long 2nd order tributary to the Broadkill River in Sussex County, Delaware.

Variant names
According to the Geographic Names Information System, it has also been known historically as:  
Prime Hook Creek
Prune Hook Creek

Course
Primehook Creek forms at the confluence of North Prong, Sowbridge Branch, and Ingram Branch in Waples Pond.  Primehook Creek then flows generally east to meet the Broadkill River at Broadkill Beach.

Watershed
Primehook Creek drains  of area, receives about 45.3 in/year of precipitation, has a topographic wetness index of 719.80 and is about 13% forested.  Primehook Creek is covered by a large Red Maple-Alder Swamp that maybe now mostly dead from saltwater intrusion.

References

External links
Prime Hook National Wildlife Refuge

Rivers of Delaware
Rivers of Sussex County, Delaware
Tributaries of Delaware Bay